David Edwin Harrell Jr. (February 22, 1930 – March 15, 2021) was an American historian best known for his scholarship of religion in the United States.

Harrell was born in Jacksonville, Florida to parents David Edwin (a physician) and Mildred Lee Harrell (a homemaker). He attended David Lipscomb College as an undergraduate, and Vanderbilt University as a graduate student. He received a Ph.D. in 1962.

Harrell was a professor at Auburn University, where he served as the Breeden Eminent Scholar of Southern History. He retired in 2006. He wrote biographies of Oral Roberts, Pat Robertson, and Homer Hailey, as well as other works about Pentecostalism and the Charismatic movement. In 2006, he published Unto a Good Land: A History of the American People, a college textbook that discusses the effects of religion in the history of the United States.

Harrell died on March 15, 2021.

References

1930 births
2021 deaths
21st-century American historians
Vanderbilt University alumni
Lipscomb University alumni
Auburn University faculty
People from Nashville, Tennessee
People from Auburn, Alabama
Writers from Jacksonville, Florida
20th-century American historians
20th-century American male writers
21st-century American male writers
American male non-fiction writers
Historians from Tennessee
Historians from Alabama
Historians from Florida
American textbook writers
American historians of religion
American members of the Churches of Christ